is an institution for research at Kyoto University into the humanities and ethno-ecological studies. It has a distinctive school tradition, as heir to the philosophically oriented Kyoto School, but differs from the latter in its broader cultural interests.

External links
home page

References 

Research institutes in Japan
Social science institutes
Kyoto University
Organizations established in 1949